Tignale (locally ) is a comune in the province of Brescia, in Lombardy, northern Italy.  It is an international tourist center on the Lake Garda.

It is formed by a series of villages located from up to 1600 m of altitude to the shores of the lake (none of them is called Tignale). The communal seat is at Gardola. Sights include the sanctuary of Montecastello, on a cliff commanding the Lake Garda, and remains of World War I fortifications.

References

Cities and towns in Lombardy
Populated places on Lake Garda